The 2013 Quito Challenger was a professional tennis tournament played on clay courts. It was the 19th edition of the tournament which was part of the 2013 ATP Challenger Tour. It took place in Quito, Ecuador between 16 and 22 September.

Singles main draw entrants

Seeds

 1 Rankings are as of September 9, 2013.

Other entrants
The following players received wildcards into the singles main draw:
  Sam Barnett
  Gonzalo Escobar
  Emilio Gómez
  Giovanni Lapentti
 
The following players received entry from the qualifying draw:
  Duilio Beretta
  Iván Endara
  Felipe Mantilla
  Juan Carlos Spir

Champions

Singles

 Víctor Estrella def.  Marco Trungelliti 2–6, 6–4, 6–4

Doubles

 Kevin King /  Juan Carlos Spir def.  Christopher Diaz-Figueroa /  Carlos Salamanca 7–5, 6–7(9–11), [11–9]

External links
Official Website

 
Quito Challenger
Quito Challenger
Quito Challenger